The Washitaw Nation (Washitaw de Dugdahmoundyah) is an African-American group associated with the Moorish Science Temple of America who claim to be a sovereign state of Native Americans within the boundaries of the United States of America. Their name is appropriated from that of the Ouachita tribe, who are also eponymous of the Washita River and of Washita, Oklahoma. The group is part of the sovereign citizen movement, whose members generally believe that they are not subject to any statutes or proceedings at the federal, state, or municipal levels.

The Washitaw Nation was headed by Verdiacee Hampton Goston (also known as Verdiacee Turner, and as Empress Verdiacee Tiari Washitaw Turner Goston El-Bey, c. 1927–2014). She was mayor of Richwood, Louisiana in 1975 and 1976, and again from 1980 to 1984, and is the author of the self-published book Return of the Ancient Ones (1993). Goston asserted that the United Nations "registers the Washitaw as indigenous people No. 215".

Classification

In 1999, the Southern Poverty Law Center estimated that the group had about 200 hard-core members, noting its popularity among followers of Moorish Science, a nationalist movement. The asserted legal basis for the establishment of the Washitaw Nation is a theory that individuals and groups may declare "sovereignty" and may separate themselves from state and federal governments, a concept earlier used by the Posse Comitatus. The argument is also made that Napoleon only sold "the streets of New Orleans and a military barracks" and that the rest of Louisiana was stolen from the Washitaw.

Various United States courts have held that the Washitaw Nation is fictional and that it is not recognized as a sovereign nation.

Actions
The Washitaw Nation is the accrediting agent for a diploma mill, the City University of Los Angeles.

References

External links
 
 Common Law Groups and Starting Small—articles critical of the Washitaw Nation
 Korosec, Thomas, "Soul food & crackers", Dallas Observer, 18 September 1997

African and Black nationalist organizations in North America
Micronations in the United States
Moorish Science Temple of America
Pseudolaw
Sovereign citizen movement
Tax resistance in the United States
African–Native American relations